Lisa Jue Xu (born 1985 in China) is an Australian milliner and nuclear medicine technologist based in Melbourne. Xu's original background is in the medical world of diagnostic imaging and now she is also an emerging talent as a designer of millinery and the owner of 'Lady of Leisure Millinery' and 'Lady of Leisure Jewellery', millinery and accessories businesses.

Fashion career
Xu is a regular racegoer and part of the inspiration for her business came from growing tired of paying a lot of money for hats and deciding make her own. She studied millinery with Waltraud Reiner of Torb and Reiner and started her fashion career by making hats and fascinators for her friends. She also credits hat designer, Philip Treacy, as one of her inspirations. Her hobby/sideline quickly grew and now her label, 'Lady of Leisure Millinery', has many Australian and international clients. The business commenced in 2010 and has already expanded, with the addition of a jewellery range.

In an article in the St Vincent's Hospital Melbourne newsletter, Xu explains that "the average hat can take up to a week to create and is made in various stages, from moulding the base to sewing and affixing different elements and adornments".

In 2010, Xu had her initial success in the mainstream millinery world when she made it to the preliminary finals in the Derby Day Fashions on the Field at Flemington. At the November 2012 Ballarat Cup meeting, Xu was awarded the Ballarat Cup Lady of the Day and a number of millinery sashes. At the February 2013 Mornington Cup meeting, Xu was the runner up in the 'Fashions on the Field Millinery Award', with her entry described as "simplistically beautiful". The 2013 Bendigo Cup race meeting was the venue for a Myer Fashions on the Field event and the Myer Millinery Award was taken out by an entrant wearing a headpiece designed by Lisa Xu. Xu was an entrant in the 2013 Flemington Derby day Fashions on the Field event in November and showed the power of online retailing by highlighting that she was able to purchase her outfit via the internet for just $200 including her suit ($100), shoes ($100) and her hat that she made ($0).

Scientific career
Xu is a nuclear medicine technologist at St Vincent’s Hospital, Melbourne, starting there in 2010. She has a Bachelor of Biomedical Science from Deakin University BSc(Hons), and a Master's of Medical Radiations specialising in Nuclear Medicine from Monash University.

Personal life
Xu is based in the Melbourne suburb of Carlton.  She has no siblings. Her mother, Lily, was the first person from her small town, Xiangtan in Hunan Province, China, to migrate to Australia, spending three years apart from her family while she worked to make a better life for them. At the age of five, Lisa and her father joined her mother in Australia. Xu attended Mentone Girls’ Grammar School where she studied VCE dance and balanced this with a great love for calisthenics in her final years at high school. She went on to study classical ballet completing all her Royal Academy of Dance (RAD) examinations. Xu's studied at Deakin and Monash universities resulted in her achieving a bachelor's degree and a master's degree.

Highlighting her interest in the racing industry, Xu is part owner of a horse in New Zealand with her fiancé.

References

External links
Example of Lisa Xu's millinery

21st-century Australian scientists
Australian women fashion designers
1986 births
Living people
Milliners
People from Xiangtan
Chinese emigrants to Australia
People from Carlton, Victoria
People educated at Mentone Girls' Grammar School
Deakin University alumni
Monash University alumni
Businesspeople from Melbourne
Australian radiologists
Scientists from Melbourne